Heroes of the 357th is a 1991 video game developed by Canadian studio Midnight Software and published by Electronic Arts for DOS.

Gameplay
Heroes of the 357th is a World War II flight simulator. The game is based on the actual missions flown by the 357th squadron (the Yoxford Boys) and their P-51 Mustangs. The action takes place in skies over France and Germany.

Reception
In 1996, Computer Gaming World declared Heroes of the 357th the 30th-worst computer game ever released.

Reviews
Computer Gaming World (Sep, 1993)
Joystick (French) (Jun, 1992)
Génération 4 (Jun, 1992)
PC Joker (Jul, 1992)

References

1991 video games
Combat flight simulators
DOS games
DOS-only games
Video games developed in Canada
World War II video games